Sunday Night Theatre was a long-running series of televised live television plays screened by BBC Television from early 1950 until 1959.

The productions for the first five years or so of the run were re-staged live the following Thursday, partly because of technical limitations in this era, and the theatrical basis of early television drama. Some of the earliest collaborations between Rudolph Cartier and Nigel Kneale were produced for this series, including Arrow to the Heart (1952, 1956) and Nineteen Eighty-Four (1954). The Sunday night drama slot was subsequently renamed The Sunday-Night Play which ran for four seasons between 1960 and 1963. ITV transmitted its own unrelated run of Sunday Night Theatre between 1969 and 1974.

Archive status 
The overwhelming majority of the run (1950–1959) of 721 plays are missing from television archives; only 27 are believed to still exist as telerecordings. The Thursday 'repeat performance; of  Nineteen Eighty-Four survives in this form. (See Wiping.)

Also among the surviving episodes are at least two from 1953, It Is Midnight, Dr. Schweitzer and The Lady from the Sea. A recording of the soundtrack of the production of Requiem for a Heavyweight broadcast in March 1957, which features Sean Connery in the lead role, was recovered in 2014.

References

External links 
 

1950 British television series debuts
1959 British television series endings
BBC Television shows
1950s British anthology television series
Lost BBC episodes
1950s British drama television series
English-language television shows
Black-and-white British television shows